María Sofía Velásquez Jaimes-Freyre (born 1971 in Ciudad de Panamá Panamá), is a Panamanian beauty pageant contestant winner of the Señorita Panamá 1993 title.

Pageantry
She represented Panamá Centro state. 

Also represented Panama in Miss Universe 1994, the 43rd Miss Universe pageant was held at the Philippine International Convention Center, in Manila, Philippines on May 20, 1994.

References

External links
 Señorita Panamá  official website

1971 births
Living people
Miss Universe 1994 contestants
Panamanian beauty pageant winners
Señorita Panamá